Neobrownliella is a genus of crustose lichens in the subfamily Teloschistoideae of the family Teloschistaceae. It has five species. The genus was circumscribed in 2015 by lichenologists Sergey Kondratyuk, Jack Elix, Ingvar Kärnefelt, and Arne Thell, with Neobrownliella brownlieae assigned as the type species. It is a segregate of the large genus Caloplaca. Characteristics of Neobrownliella include a thallus that is continuous or areolate, the presence of anthraquinones as lichen products, a cortical layer with a palisade paraplectenchyma, and the lack of a thick palisade cortical layer on the underside of the thalline exciple (the ring-shaped layer of tissue surrounding the hymenium). Two species were included in the original circumscription of the genus; an additional three species were added in 2020.

Species

Neobrownliella brownlieae  – Australia
Neobrownliella cinnabarina 
Neobrownliella holochracea 
Neobrownliella montisfracti  – Australia
Neobrownliella salyangensis  – South Korea

References

Teloschistales
Teloschistales genera
Lichen genera
Taxa described in 2015
Taxa named by Sergey Kondratyuk
Taxa named by John Alan Elix
Taxa named by Ingvar Kärnefelt